Phaulernis pulchra is a moth of the family Epermeniidae. It is found in the Russian Far East and Japan (Hokkaido, Kyushu).

The length of the forewings is about 6 mm for males and 7 mm for females. The forewings are dark fuscous with leaden reflections. The hindwings are fuscous.

References

Moths described in 1993
Epermeniidae
Moths of Japan
Moths of Asia